Podabrus tomentosus is a species of soldier beetle in the family Cantharidae. It is found in North America.

References

Further reading

External links

 

Cantharidae
Articles created by Qbugbot
Beetles described in 1825